Rhacodinella is a genus of parasitic flies in the family Tachinidae. There are at least two described species in Rhacodinella.

Species
These two species belong to the genus Rhacodinella:
 Rhacodinella apicata (Pandelle, 1896)
 Rhacodinella aurata Mesnil, 1970

References

Further reading

 
 
 
 

Tachinidae
Articles created by Qbugbot